H. Otto Wachsmann Jr. is an American politician and pharmacist who is a member of the Virginia House of Delegates for the 75th district. Elected in November 2021, he assumed office on January 12, 2022.

Education 
Wachsmann attended the College of William & Mary for two years and earned a Bachelor of Science degree in pharmacy from the VCU School of Pharmacy.

Career 
Wachsmann worked as a pharmacist for Peoples Drug before working for several independent pharmacies. Wachsmann later worked as an office manager at the A. H. Robins Company. He later worked as a manager at the company. In 1996, Wachsmann took an administrative role at the Bernard J. Dunn School of Pharmacy of Shenandoah University. He returned to Winchester, Virginia in 2003 to take over his father's pharmacy. He was elected to the Virginia House of Delegates from the 75th district in November 2021 and will assume office on January 1, 2022.

Personal life 
Wachsmann and his wife, Judy, have two daughters.

References 

Living people
American pharmacologists
People from Winchester, Virginia
People from Sussex County, Virginia
Virginia Commonwealth University alumni
Republican Party members of the Virginia House of Delegates
Year of birth missing (living people)